F500 may refer to:

 Formula 500, a regulated racing series for vehicles powered by two-cylinder, water-cooled two-stroke engines.
 Fiat 500, a historical two-door vehicle series produced by Fiat Automobiles from 1957 to 1975.
 Fortune 500, an annual list compiled and published by Fortune magazine that ranks 500 of the largest United States corporations by total revenue for their respective fiscal years.
 Ford F-500, a medium-duty truck